From List of National Natural Landmarks, these are the National Natural Landmarks in Missouri.  There are 16 in total.

Missouri
Landmarks